The 2022 Men's Pan-American Volleyball Cup was the 15th edition of the annual men's volleyball tournament. It was held in Gatineau, Quebec, Canada, from 9 August to 14 August. Eight teams competed in the tournament.

Competing nations

Competition format
The competition format for the Pan-American Volleyball Cup divides the eight participating teams in two groups of four teams each.

The best team from Group A and Group B will advance to the semifinals, the second and third teams from Group B will play the quarterfinals against the second and third teams from Pool A. The remaining teams will play for the 5th to 8th placement matches.

Pool standing procedure
Match won 3–0: 5 points for the winner, 0 point for the loser
Match won 3–1: 4 points for the winner, 1 points for the loser
Match won 3–2: 3 points for the winner, 2 points for the loser
In case of tie, the teams were classified according to the following criteria:
points ratio and sets ratio

Preliminary round
All times are Eastern Daylight Time (UTC−04:00).

Group A

Group B

|}

Final round
All times are Eastern Daylight Time (UTC−04:00).

Play-offs

5th–8th classification

Semifinals

7th place match

5th place match

3rd place match

Final

Final standing

{| class="wikitable" style="text-align:center"
|-
!width=40|Rank
!width=180|Team
|-
|
|style="text-align:left"|
|-
|
|style="text-align:left"|
|-
|
|style="text-align:left"|
|-
|4
|style="text-align:left"|
|-
|5
|style="text-align:left"|
|-
|6
|style="text-align:left"|
|-
|7
|style="text-align:left"|
|-
|8
|style="text-align:left"|
|}

Awards

Most Valuable Player

Best Scorer

Best Outside Hitters

Best Middle Blockers

Best Setter

Best Opposite

Best Libero

Best Digger

Best Receiver

Best Server

See also
2022 Women's Pan-American Volleyball Cup

References

Men's Pan-American Volleyball Cup
Pan-American
2022 in Canadian sports
International volleyball competitions hosted by Canada
Men's Pan-American Volleyball
Sport in Gatineau
2022 in Quebec